Renée Adorée (born Émilia Louisa Victoria Reeves; 30 September 1898 – 5 October 1933) was a French stage and film actress who appeared in Hollywood silent movies during the 1920s. She is best known for portraying the role of Melisande, the love interest of John Gilbert in the melodramatic romance and war epic The Big Parade. Adorée‘s career was cut short after she contracted tuberculosis in 1930. She died of the disease in 1933 at the age of 35.

Early life
Born in Lille as Jeanne de la Fonte, Adorée was the daughter of circus artists and performed regularly with her parents as a child. She performed as an acrobat, dancer and bareback rider throughout Europe.  She adopted the stage name Renée Adorée (French for "reborn" and "adored", both in the feminine form), and established a reputation for her dancing skills in countries including Belgium, France, Germany and Sweden. She was performing in Brussels when World War I began.

She was billed as Renée Adorée in an Australian film produced in 1918, £500 Reward, which was her movie debut. She was then a dancer touring Australia on the Tivoli circuit with an act called "The Magneys".

Career
Adorée went to New York City in 1919, where she was cast in a vaudeville-style musical called Oh, Uncle. This opened at the Garrick Theatre in Washington, D.C. in March 1919; by mid March, it was being staged in Trenton, New Jersey, and subsequently toured through the summer. In July, it was renamed Oh, What a Girl! and opened at the Shubert Theatre in New York City. Over the next several months, she toured in The Dancer, another Shubert production.

In January 1920, the opportunity arose for her to further her motion picture career when she was cast for the lead role in The Strongest, directed by Raoul Walsh. The Strongest was a dramatic photoplay written by French prime minister Georges Clemenceau. She went on to star in several other silent films in the early 1920s, including Reginald Barker's The Eternal Struggle, the film which established her as a Hollywood star and also starred Barbara La Marr and Earle Williams.

Adorée is most famous for her role as Melisande in the melodramatic romance and war epic The Big Parade (1925) opposite John Gilbert. It became one of MGM's highest-grossing silent films, earning between $18 million and $22 million, and made her into a major star.

In all, Adorée made nine films with Gilbert and appeared in four with leading Hollywood actor Ramón Novarro. She starred with Lon Chaney in 1927's Mr Wu. In The Mating Call, a 1928 film produced by Howard Hughes, Adorée had a very brief swimming scene in the nude that caused a commotion at the time.

Personal life 
While in New York City on New Year's Eve 1921, she met Tom Moore, who was fifteen years her senior. Moore and his brothers were Irish immigrants who had become popular Hollywood actors. Six weeks after their meeting, on 12 February 1921, Adorée married Moore at his home in Beverly Hills, California. The marriage ended in divorce in 1926. In June 1927, Adorée married again, this time to William Sherman Gill whom, in 1929, she also divorced.

Illness and death

With the advent of sound in film, Adorée was one of the fortunate stars whose voices met the film industry's new needs, appearing in two all-talking films before her death. By the end of 1930, Adorée had appeared in forty five films, the last four of which were sound pictures. That year, she was diagnosed with tuberculosis. Adorée went against her physician's advice by finishing her final film Call of the Flesh with Ramón Novarro. At its completion, she was rushed to a sanatorium in Prescott, Arizona, where she lay flat on her back for two years in an effort to regain her physical health. In April 1933, she left the sanatorium. At this point, it was thought she had recovered sufficiently to resume her screen career, but she swiftly weakened and her health declined day by day. In September 1933, Adorée was moved from her modest home in the Tujunga Hills to the Sunland health resort in Los Angeles. She died there on October 5, 1933. She is interred in the Hollywood Forever Cemetery.

Adorée left an estate valued at $2,429. The only heir was her mother, who lived in England. No will was found. For her contributions to the film industry, Adorée has a motion pictures star on the Hollywood Walk of Fame at 1601, Vine Street.

Filmography

References

Bibliography

External links

 
 
 Renée Adorée at Golden Silents
 
 Renée Adorée at the TCM Movie Database
 Photographs and literature

1898 births
1933 deaths
20th-century French actresses
20th-century deaths from tuberculosis
Burials at Hollywood Forever Cemetery
French circus performers
French expatriate actresses in the United States
French film actresses
French silent film actresses
French stage actresses
Mass media people from Lille
Tuberculosis deaths in California